Bromborough Rake railway station is one of two stations serving the town of Bromborough in Merseyside, England. The station is situated on the Chester and Ellesmere Port branches of the Wirral Line, part of the Merseyrail network.

History 
The station was opened by British Rail in 1985, to coincide with the electrification of the line between Rock Ferry and Hooton, which allowed through trains to Liverpool, via the Mersey Railway Tunnel.

Facilities
The station is staffed, during all opening hours, and has platform CCTV. There is a payphone and a booking office. There are departure and arrival screens, on the platform, for passenger information. Each of the two platforms has sheltered seating. There is no car park at the station, though there is a drop-off point. There is secure cycle parking for 20 cycles. Access to the station booking office is straightforward. Access to both platforms is by ramp, allowing easy access for passengers with wheelchairs or prams.

Services

As of 22 August 2022, trains operate every 30 minutes between Liverpool and Ellesmere Port.  Trains operating between Liverpool and Chester no longer call at Bromborough Rake to improve the punctuality of services on the Chester line.  Any passengers travelling between Bromborough Rake and Chester now need to change at Hooton.
Northbound trains operate via Hamilton Square station in Birkenhead and the Mersey Railway Tunnel to Liverpool. Southbound trains travel towards Hooton, where the lines to Chester and Ellesmere Port divide. These services are provided by Merseyrail's fleet of Class 507 and Class 508 EMUs.

References

Further reading

External links 

Railway stations in the Metropolitan Borough of Wirral
DfT Category E stations
Railway stations opened by British Rail
Railway stations in Great Britain opened in 1985
Railway stations served by Merseyrail